Rodney Stacey Smith (born April 13, 1966) is an American wrestler. He was born in Washington, D.C., but grew up in Springfield, Massachusetts. Smith attended Western New England University. Coached by head coach Robert Skelton and Assistant Coach Bryon Gross, Smith was a two-time NCAA Division III All-American. After Smith graduated in 1988, he enlisted in the United States Army. He participated in the World Class Athlete Program.  He won the bronze medal in Greco-Roman wrestling at the 1992 Summer Olympics. Smith is now working at HCSS (Hampden Charter School of Science) in West Springfield.

References

1966 births
Living people
Sportspeople from Washington, D.C.
Wrestlers at the 1992 Summer Olympics
Wrestlers at the 1996 Summer Olympics
American male sport wrestlers
Olympic bronze medalists for the United States in wrestling
Medalists at the 1992 Summer Olympics
African-American sport wrestlers
U.S. Army World Class Athlete Program